1839 in archaeology

Explorations

 John Lloyd Stephens and Frederick Catherwood explore the Maya ruins of Copan.

Excavations
English archeologist A. H. Layard begins excavations of Nineveh.
First excavation of Roman villa at Rudston in the East Riding of Yorkshire, England.
First excavation of Roman villa at Oplontis in Italy begins.

Publications

Births
 January 4 - Carl Humann, German archaeologist (d. 1896)
 July 12 - Jean Baptiste Holzmayer, German archaeologist (d. 1890)

Deaths
 August 28 - William Smith, English geologist (b. 1769)
 Juan Galindo, Irish-born Central American soldier, governor and explorer (b. 1802)

See also
 List of years in archaeology

References

Archaeology
Archaeology by year
Archaeology
Archaeology